The 35th Air Division (35th AD) is an inactive United States Air Force organization.  Its last assignment was with Air Defense Command, assigned to First Air Force, at Hancock Field, New York.  It was inactivated on 19 November 1969.

History

Assigned to Air Defense Command (ADC) for most of its existence, from July 1951 – November 1969, the 35th "equipped, administered, and trained its assigned and attached units and placed those forces in a maximum state of readiness for use in air defense. Initially, its area of responsibility included all or part of Tennessee, North Carolina, South Carolina, Georgia, Alabama, Florida, and Mississippi".

"In 1966, the area changed to include most of New York, Vermont, New Hampshire, Massachusetts, and southern Maine when the division assumed the responsibilities of the inactivated Boston Air Defense Sector. "

Assumed additional designation of 35th NORAD Region after activation of the NORAD Combat Operations Center at the Cheyenne Mountain Complex, Colorado and reporting was transferred to NORAD from ADC at Ent Air Force Base in April 1966.  "The division participated in numerous live and simulated exercises such as Apache Brave, Mohawk Echo, and Desk Top."

Inactivated in November 1969 as ADC phased down its interceptor mission as the chances of a Soviet bomber attack on the United States seemed remote, its mission being consolidated into North American Aerospace Defense Command (NORAD).

Lineage
 Established as the 35 Air Division (Defense) on 11 June 1951
 Activated on 1 July 1951
 Inactivated on 1 February 1952
 Organized on 1 February 1952
 Inactivated on 15 November 1958
 Redesignated 35 Air Division and activated on 20 January 1966 (not organized)
 Organized on 1 April 1966
 Inactivated on 19 November 1969

Assignments
 Central Air Defense Force, 1 July 1951 – 10 April 1955
 Eastern Air Defense Force, 10 April 1955 – 15 November 1958
 Air Defense Command, 20 January 1966 (not organized)
 First Air Force, 1 April 1966 – 19 November 1969

Stations
 Kansas City, Missouri, 1 July – 1 September 1951
 Dobbins Air Force Base, Georgia, 4 September 1951 – 15 November 1958
 Hancock Field, New York, 1 April 1966 – 19 November 1969

Components

Sector
 Montgomery Air Defense Sector
 Gunter Air Force Base, Alabama, 8 September 1957 – 15 November 1958

Wing
 52d Fighter Wing (Air Defense)
 Suffolk County Air Force Base, New York, 1 December 1967 – 30 September 1968

Groups
 52d Fighter Group
 Suffolk County Air Force Base, New York, 30 September 1968 1966 – 31 December 1969
 355th Fighter Group
 McGhee-Tyson MAP, Tennessee, 18 August 1955 1966 – 1 March 1956
 516th Air Defense Group
 McGhee-Tyson MAP, Tennessee, 16 February 1953 1966 – 18 August 1955

Interceptor squadron
 27th Fighter-Interceptor Squadron
 Loring Air Force Base, Maine, 15 September 1966 – 19 November 1969

Missile squadrons
 26th Air Defense Missile Squadron (BOMARC)
 Otis Air Force Base, Massachusetts, 1 April 1966 1966 – 19 November 1969
 35th Air Defense Missile Squadron (BOMARC)
 Niagara Falls Air Force Missile Site, New York, 15 September 1966 – 19 November 1969
 46th Air Defense Missile Squadron (BOMARC)
 McGuire Air Force Base, New Jersey, 1 December 1967 1966 – 1 October 1972

Radar squadrons

 609th Aircraft Control and Warning Squadron
 Eufaula Air Force Station, Alabama, 1 September 1957 1966 – 15 November 1958
 614th Aircraft Control and Warning Squadron
 Dobbins Air Force Base, Georgia, 24 December 1953 1966 – 1 July 1956
 627th Aircraft Control and Warning Squadron
 Crystal Springs Air Force Station, Mississippi, 1 September 1957 1966 – 15 November 1958
 632d Aircraft Control and Warning Squadron
 Roanoke Rapids Air Force Station, North Carolina, 20 May 1953 1966 – 1 March 1956
 648th Radar Squadron
 Benton Air Force Station, Pennsylvania, 1 April 1966 1966 – 19 November 1969
 655th Radar Squadron
 Watertown Air Force Station, New York, 1 April 1966 1966 – 19 November 1969
 656th Radar Squadron
 Saratoga Springs Air Force Station, New York, 1 April 1966 1966 – 19 November 1969
 657th Aircraft Control and Warning Squadron
 Houma Air Force Station, Louisiana, 10 April 1955 1966 – 15 November 1958
 660th Aircraft Control and Warning Squadron
 MacDill Air Force Base, Florida, 18 June 1953 1966 – 15 November 1958
 663d Aircraft Control and Warning Squadron
 Lake City Air Force Station, Tennessee, 5 August 1952 1966 – 1 March 1956
 678th Aircraft Warning and Control Squadron
 Tyndall Air Force Base, Florida, 1 February 1956 1966 – 1 April 1957
 679th Aircraft Control and Warning Squadron
 Jacksonville Naval Air Station, Florida, 24 December 1953 1966 – 15 November 1958
 680th Radar Squadron
 Palermo Air Force Station, New Jersey, 1 December 1967 1966 – 1 April 1968
 691st Aircraft Control and Warning Squadron
 Cross City Air Force Station, Florida, 1 December 1957 1966 – 15 November 1958
 693d Aircraft Control and Warning Squadron
 Dauphin Island Air Force Station, Alabama, 1 April 1966 – 15 November 1958
 698th Aircraft Control and Warning Squadron
 Thomasville Air Force Station, Alabama, 1 December 1957 1966 – 15 November 1958
 701st Aircraft Control and Warning Squadron
 Fort Fisher Air Force Station, North Carolina, 1 December 1953 1966 – 1 March 1956

 702d Aircraft Control and Warning Squadron
 Hunter Air Force Base, Georgia, 1 December 1953 1966 – 15 November 1958
 762d Radar Squadron
 North Truro Air Force Station, Massachusetts, 1 April 1966 1966 – 19 November 1969
 763d Radar Squadron
 Lockport Air Force Station, New York, 15 September 1966 – 19 November 1969
 764th Radar Squadron
 Saint Albans Air Force Station, Vermont, 1 April 1966 1966 – 19 November 1969
 765th Radar Squadron
 Charleston Air Force Station, Maine, 15 September 1966 – 19 November 1969
 766th Radar Squadron
 Caswell Air Force Station, Maine, 15 September 1966 – 19 November 1969
 772d Radar Squadron
 Gibbsboro Air Force Station, New Jersey, 1 December 1967 1966 – 19 November 1969
 773d Radar Squadron
 Montauk Air Force Station, New York, 1 December 1967 1966 – 19 November 1969
 783d Aircraft Control and Warning Squadron
 Guthrie Air Force Station, West Virginia, 1 September 1966 – 15 November 1958
 784th Aircraft Control and Warning Squadron
 Snow Mountain Air Force Station, Kentucky, 1 September 1966 – 15 November 1958
 792d Aircraft Control and Warning Squadron
 North Charleston Air Force Station, South Carolina, 24 December 1953 1966 – 15 November 1958
 799th Aircraft Control and Warning Squadron
 Joelton Air Force Station, Tennessee, 1 September 1958 1966 – 1 June 1961
 810th Aircraft Control and Warning Squadron
 Winston-Salem Air Force Station, North Carolina, 1 September 1966 – 15 November 1958
 861st Aircraft Warning and Control Squadron
 Aiken Air Force Station, South Carolina, 8 April 1955 1966 – 15 November 1958
 867th Aircraft Control and Warning Squadron
 Flintstone Air Force Station, Georgia, 1 October 1955 1966 – 1 March 1956; 15 November 1958 1966 – 25 July 1960
 907th Aircraft Control and Warning Squadron
 Bucks Harbor Air Force Station, Maine, 15 September 1966 – 19 November 1969
 908th Aircraft Control and Warning Squadron
 Marietta Air Force Station, Georgia, 25 September 1954 1966 – 15 November 1958

See also
 List of United States Air Force Aerospace Defense Command Interceptor Squadrons
 List of United States Air Force air divisions
 United States general surveillance radar stations

References

Notes

Bibliography

 
 
 

Aerospace Defense Command units
035
1951 establishments in Missouri
1969 disestablishments in New York (state)